The 1937–38 Chicago Black Hawks season was the team's 12th season in the NHL. They were attempting to bounce off a horrible 1936–37 season, in which the club failed to qualify for the playoffs.  In the off-season, the team would replace head coach Clem Loughlin with Bill Stewart.  The Black Hawks would struggle again in 1937–38, finishing with 37 points with a 14–25–9 record, but managed to earn a playoff spot by finishing two points ahead of the Detroit Red Wings and clinch third place in the American Division.  They would score an NHL low 97 goals, while giving up the 2nd most goals in the league at 139.  The Hawks were a .500 team at home with a 10–10–4 record, but would only have a record of 4–15–5 on the road.

Paul Thompson would lead the Hawks offensively, setting a club record with 44 points, along with a club high 22 goals, and tying Doc Romnes for the team lead with 22 assists.  Johnny Gottselig would have another solid season, earning 32 points, tying Romnes for 2nd on the team scoring list.  Earl Seibert would lead the defense with 21 points, and had a club high 38 penalty minutes.

In goal, Mike Karakas would win 14 games, earn a shutout and post a 2.80 GAA.

In the playoffs, the Black Hawks would face the Montreal Canadiens in the 1st round in a best-of-three series.  The underdog Hawks would surprise Montreal, winning the best-of three series in the full three games, clinching the series with a 3–2 OT victory at the Montreal Forum.  After losing Game One to Montreal, the Hawks were less than 90 seconds away from being eliminated in the quarterfinals, but managed to tie Game Two late in the third period.  Chicago won the crucial game in overtime.  Next up would be the New York Americans, who finished 2nd in the Canadian Division, and had 12 more points than the Hawks in the regular season.  In a best-of-three semi-final series, the Black Hawks again lost the first game of the series and were on the verge of elimination in Game Two but won it in overtime.  The Black Hawks would stun the favored Americans, winning the Game Three to win the series 2–1 and advance to the Stanley Cup Finals.  The Hawks opponent would be the Toronto Maple Leafs, who had just swept the best team in the regular season, the Boston Bruins, in a best-of-five semi-final series featuring the champions of the NHL's two divisions

Due to an injury to goaltender Mike Karakas, the Black Hawks would get permission by the Leafs to use goaltender Alfie Moore, who spent the season with the Pittsburgh Hornets of the IAHL in the first game, and he responded by helping the Black Hawks win the game 3–1.  In the 2nd game, Karakas was still unavailable, and Chicago would call up Paul Goodman from the Wichita Skyhawks of the AHA.  The Maple Leafs would even up the series with a 5–1 victory.  The Black Hawks would get Karakas back into the lineup for the 3rd game, and he helped the Hawks to a 2–1 victory.  Chicago would then wrap up the series in the 4th game, winning by a score of 4–1 to earn its 2nd Stanley Cup in team history, shocking the hockey world.

Season standings

Record vs. opponents

Game log

Regular season

Playoffs

Chicago Black Hawks 2, Montreal Canadiens 1

Chicago Black Hawks 2, New York Americans 1

Chicago Black Hawks 3, Toronto Maple Leafs 1

Season stats

Scoring leaders

Goaltending

Playoff stats

Scoring leaders

Goaltending

References 

 SHRP Sports
 The Internet Hockey Database
 National Hockey League Guide & Record Book 2007

Stanley Cup championship seasons
Chicago Blackhawks seasons
Chicago
Chicago